The Socialist Workers Party (SWP) is a far-left political party in the United Kingdom. Founded as the Socialist Review Group by supporters of Tony Cliff in 1950, it became the International Socialists in 1962 and the SWP in 1977. The group, initially of only eight members, was formed around Tony Cliff's analysis of Russia as a bureaucratic state capitalist regime and were expelled from the Revolutionary Communist Party. Three documents formed the theoretical basis of the group, namely The Nature of Stalinist Russia, The Class Nature of the People's Democracies and Marxism and the Theory of Bureaucratic Collectivism.

The tiny size of the group meant that they adopted entryism as a means of working in the Labour Party in order to reach an audience and recruit. Of particular importance was the Labour League of Youth; from the 33 members at the first recorded meeting, 19 were in the LLY.

Through campaigning within the Campaign for Nuclear Disarmament and the Young Socialists, a new Labour Party youth movement, the Socialist Review Group was able to recruit among a new generation of activists and by 1964 had a membership of 200. In 1959, the first edition of Cliff's book on Rosa Luxemburg was published. In this, Cliff asserts: Rosa Luxemburg's conception of the structure of the revolutionary organisation – that they should be built from below up, on a consistently democratic basis – fits the needs of the workers' movement in the advanced countries much more closely than Lenin's conception of 1902−4, which was copied and given an added bureaucratic twist by Stalinists the world over. Cliff wrote in 1960 that Leon Trotsky's insight in 1904 about Vladimir Lenin's substitutionism was a strong warning of the serious flaws "inherent in Lenin’s conception of party organisation" sustained by events since 1917.

International Socialist period 
The paper Industrial Worker was created in 1961 and was quickly renamed Labour Worker before evolving into Socialist Worker. Socialist Review was reduced in size and then scrapped. The Socialist Review Group became the International Socialism Group (IS) at the end of 1962.

With the Labour Party in power and many Labour members becoming disillusioned, IS started doing more work that was external to the Labour Party and ceased to practise entryism as a tactic around 1965. After 1967, few IS members were active in that party. In 1965, an article in Labour Worker said: "Obviously Marxists should take those positions which give access to the direct workers’ organisations. But in the wards and GMCs the practice of buying the right to discuss politics by over-fulfilling the canvassing norms, should cease or be reduced to the minimum".

It marked a turn to more of a focus on work in the trade unions, and a key part of this process was the pamphlet published in 1966: Incomes policy, legislation and shop stewards, which opposed the Labour Party's incomes policy and discussed how it could be fought.

In 1968, the group adopted Leninist democratic centralism as an organisational practice, returning to Cliff's original position after leaving aside brief flirtations with Luxemburgian critiques of party vanguardism. This period saw the IS heavily involved in the Vietnam Solidarity Campaign (in support of the Viet Cong) and local variations of the student protests of 1968, where it was able to recruit from this pool of youngsters. As a result, the IS grew from 400 to 1,000 members but also suffered many splits. According to group historian Ian Birchall, "IS’s position was always one of unconditional support for the IRA in the struggle against imperialism". However, Socialist Worker argued against those who prematurely raised the slogan "Troops Out!" on the grounds that the presence of British troops would allow the nationalist population to recover: The breathing space provided by the presence of British troops is short but vital. Those who call for the immediate withdrawal of the troops before the men behind the barricades can defend themselves are inviting a pogrom which will hit first and hardest at socialists.

With hindsight, Tony Cliff concluded that the years 1970–74 had been "the best years of my life". That period saw the creation of rank and file newspapers and a general turn to industry, including setting up factory branches. During the 1972 miners' strike, Socialist Worker was taken and sold by miners. Between March 1972 and March 1974, the membership of IS increased from 2,351 to 3,310 and also recruited a large number of manual workers into membership. Meanwhile, other much smaller far-left groups emerged as a result of their members being expelled from the IS. The Workers' Fight group joined as an open and allowed faction, but were expelled in 1971, and ultimately became the Alliance for Workers' Liberty. In 1975, what had been known as the Left Faction suffered the same fate, and became Workers Power. The Revolutionary Faction were expelled from the IS in 1973. The resulting Revolutionary Communist Group soon found itself with an internal opposition which eventually became the Revolutionary Communist Party led by Frank Furedi.

Labour in power and the SWP formed 
In 1974, Labour returned to power and introduced the Social Contract which implemented a voluntary incomes policy, with the backing of many left wing union leaders such as Hugh Scanlon and Jack Jones. This period also saw an increase in the number of full-time union convenors, and these factors along with an increase in unemployment have been blamed by Tony Cliff and the SWP for a drastic fall in union militancy. In 1974 the IS was ambitious and optimistic expecting to double the number of its factory branches over the next year. In practice they declined swiftly from 38 in 1974 to only three or four by 1976. When the firefighters went on strike in 1977 against the Social Contract the IS was unable to deliver any significant solidarity. The national rank and file movement fell apart. In 1976 the SWP decided to stand in parliamentary by-elections but the results were very poor and the original idea of standing in 60 seats at the next election was dropped.

In January 1977, IS was renamed the Socialist Workers Party. This decision was a result of the move to stand in elections along with a perception that: "IS’s ability to initiate activity, rather than simply join in movements launched by others, had never been greater. Industrially, there were more members than ever able to lead disputes in their own workplaces". According to Martin Shaw, this occurred with no real discussion within the organisation. Jim Higgins has claimed: "Its founding was for purely internal reasons, to give the members a sense of progress, the better to conceal the fact that there had actually been a retreat".

Anti-Nazi League and Rock against Racism 
A campaign in which the SWP had a significant role at this time was the Anti-Nazi League (ANL), and viewed as a "front" for the organisation by commentators and historians. The National Front (NF) grew during the 1970s and in the May 1976 local elections polled 15,340 votes in Leicester and large votes elsewhere. They were even more visible on the streets through graffiti, racist attacks and street protests. A key turning point came when on 13 August 1977 thousands of anti-fascists, later joined by large numbers of local black youths, attempted to stop the NF from marching through Lewisham.

Following the perceived success of the 13 August mobilisation in Lewisham, the SWP launched the Anti Nazi League in the Autumn of 1977 with a series of celebrity-endorsed adverts published in the press. Although it was portrayed as a broad initiative supported by the SWP along with wide swathes of the Labour Left and figures from popular culture (singers, musicians, actors and so on), the ANL was seen by many on the left as a self-serving unilateral SWP initiative to seize the leadership of the anti-racist movement and was regarded with suspicion by many anti-racist/anti-fascist activists. This was particularly true of many in the existing broad-based Anti-Fascist Committees (often with close connections to the local labour and trade union movement). The fact that local ANL groups were often launched as an SWP-led alternative to existing broad-based Anti-Fascist Committees increased the suspicions of non-SWP activists but a widespread desire not to display public divisions and a fear of alienating the ANL's celebrity sponsors meant that these divisions were kept fairly quiet. The ANL also received support from other Trotskyist groups and the Communist Party of Great Britain, who restrained their members and supporters from openly criticising the ANL.

In response to Eric Clapton's public support for Enoch Powell, Rock Against Racism was set up in close collaboration with the ANL and a series of successful carnivals were organised. Among the bands involved with Rock Against Racism were The Clash (as seen in the film Rude Boy), The Buzzcocks, Steel Pulse, X-Ray Spex, The Ruts, Generation X and the Tom Robinson Band. By 1981, the NF had fragmented becoming far smaller, and the campaign was wound up.

Downturn 
From 1978 onward, Tony Cliff became convinced by some of his comrades that the period of rising militancy had come to an end and a downturn had begun. Cliff wrote: "The crisis in the organisation went on for about 3 years, 1976–79". By 1982, the SWP was refocused completely to a propagandist approach, with geographical branches as the main unit of the party, a focus on Marxist theory and an abandonment of perspective of building a rank and file movement. The rank and file organisations were wound down, as were the ANL, the women's organisation Women's Voice and the paper for ethnic minorities Flame. Many of those active in the ANL and especially its defence "squads" were denounced as "squadist" and expelled, later going on to form Anti-Fascist Action and Red Action.

The closure of Women's Voice in 1982, reputedly because it tried to inject feminist thinking into SWP theoretical practice rather than gaining women members for the party, was a bitterly disputed action made by the leadership, a sharp debate taking place between those who believed the result would be to ignore the specificities of women's oppression, and those who believed that feminist theories were in danger of losing contact with the united interests of men and women workers.

During the 1984–1985 miners' strike, the SWP's propaganda concentrated on the need for solidarity and explaining why this was not happening. Cliff described the approach as one of concrete propaganda: "It had to answer the question 'What slogan fits the issue the workers are fighting over?'".

This change in outlook and methods was viewed by many on the left as being a retreat into sectarianism by the SWP, but this change in methods is credited by the SWP as allowing it to survive a very hostile period with substantial numbers of party members. In contrast Murray Smith described it as "jumping from one campaign to the next and hostility towards the rest of the left".

1990s 
The early 1990s, for many of the far-left, was a period of demoralisation and disorientation, due to the collapse of the Soviet Union. However, for the SWP this was seen as a vindication of their long held analysis that the Soviet Union was a 'state capitalist' society. They argued that "the transition from state capitalism to multinational capitalism is neither a step forward nor a step backwards, but a step sidewards. The change only involves a shift from one form of exploitation to another form for the working class as a whole."

It was this period, that the Revolutionary Democratic Group were expelled and became in their words, "an external faction". The SWP was involved in the relaunch the ANL in 1992 in response to the growth of the British National Party and campaigned against the Criminal Justice Bill. A demonstration for justice for murdered teenager Stephen Lawrence near the BNP headquarters in Welling in 1993 turned into a violent confrontation with the police, leading to criticism from Ken Livingstone, then a Labour MP and a supporter of the rival Anti-Racist Alliance (ARA) in which Socialist Action played a major role. Livingstone argued that this kind of action was playing into the hands of the BNP. He said at the time: "No one's discussing [the BNP's] policies. Now the question is the violence of the SWP, arguments between the police and the SWP about who is to blame". Although Stephen's mother Doreen Lawrence attended the Welling demo, she came to realise that the ANL was a "front for the Socialist Workers Party". She later wrote that "the various groups that had taken an interest in Stephen's death were tearing each other apart and were in danger of destroying our campaign which we wanted to keep focused and dignified", and Doreen and Neville Lawrence wrote to both the ANL and ARA to demand that they "stop using Stephen's name".

In 1997, despite being highly opposed to Tony Blair's policies, they called for a vote for the Labour Party with the belief that there would rapidly be a crisis of expectations in Labour, which would lead New Labour voters to question their allegiances, opening up opportunities, space for organisation and activity to the left of Labour that is traditionally occupied by the party when it is in opposition. John Rees wrote in July 1997: "In the mid-term the 'sado-monetarist' strategy followed by the Labour government will clash increasingly sharply with a working class movement which has drawn hope and confidence from its electoral victory over the Tories".

Involvement with other groups 

The SWP was involved with the Socialist Alliance in England and the Welsh Socialist Alliance. Its Scottish members joined the Scottish Socialist Party as the Socialist Worker Platform in May 2001. The SWP was accused of financial impropriety by Liz Davies and by a former SA press officer of "running" the Alliance into the ground.

In the aftermath of 9/11, the SWP approached other groups, such as the Muslim Association of Britain and the Communist Party of Britain. With them, they launched the Stop the War Coalition, although the SWP ("old hands" at controlling popular fronts, according to the comedian and activist Mark Thomas) was the dominant organisation, The Coalition's aims were to oppose to the invasion of Afghanistan and subsequently Iraq and to campaign against attacks on Muslims. Lindsey German was elected as Convenor and John Rees and Chris Nineham were appointed as national officers, all leading SWP members at the time. The Coalition organised a demonstration on 15 February 2003 when around 750,000 people (according to the Police) or up to 2 million (according to the organisers)  marched through London.

The SWP described the Iraqi insurgency as a "resistance" movement against military occupation and endorsed George Galloway's support of Hezbollah, who they described as "the resistance". In addition, the Muslim Association of Britain was accused of being a conservative Islamist body sharing only anti-western sentiments with groups like the SWP and Respect. Former Socialist Alliance and Stop the War activist and press officer Anna Chen saw Lindsey German's comment "I'm in favour of defending gay rights, but I am not prepared to have it as a shibboleth, [created by] people who ... won't defend George Galloway", as the party's equivalent of Labour's revision of Clause IV. According to John Rentoul, the SWP and its allies were not against the war at all, but in favour of Saddam Hussein winning. John Rees has said: "Socialists should unconditionally stand with the oppressed against the oppressor, even if the people who run the oppressed country are undemocratic and persecute minorities, like Saddam Hussein."

According to John Rees, discussions with George Galloway about establishing a new group had begun to coalesce in December 2002. In England and Wales around January 2004 the SWP began an involvement in Respect – The Unity Coalition, an electoral alliance with a single Member of Parliament, the ex-Labour MP George Galloway, and a small number of councillors. The coalition between the SWP and Galloway's group finally collapsed in Autumn 2007 with both sides blaming the other for the split.

After the schism, a faction led by the SWP formed the Left List (now called Left Alternative). In Scotland, the SWP existed as a platform of the Scottish Socialist Party but in August 2006, it decided to split from the SSP in order to pursue a new political grouping with Tommy Sheridan's Solidarity, founded a few months after Sheridan's successful defamation case, but before his eventual conviction for perjury in 2010. In that year, the SWP joined the Trade Unionist and Socialist Coalition and stood five candidates in the general election.

The jazz musician Gilad Atzmon performed at SWP events for several years from 2004, and was promoted by the party as delivering "fearless tirades against Zionism". Because Atzmon believed the text of The Protocols of the Elders of Zion, a hoax from the early 20th century, was a valid reflection of contemporary America, Oliver Kamm wrote in The Times in 2006 that the SWP were "allying with classic anti-Semitism". Atzmon and the SWP were similarly accused by other writers. The party eventually severed their association with Atzmon.

Incidents and Central Committee resignations 
In January 2009, John Rees, Lindsey German and Chris Nineham resigned from the Central Committee at party conference before forming an oppositional Left Platform in the party in October 2009 with the support of 64 members. The faction agreed to disband after the party's January 2010 conference. Two members of the Left Platform were expelled over allegations of secret factionalising outside of the three-month period prior to conference (in which open factions are permitted). The expulsions were contested at the conference of 2010 but a majority of the more than 500 delegates voted in favour of the expulsions which were then ratified. In February 2010, sixty former members of the Left Platform including John Rees, Lindsey German and Chris Nineham resigned from the SWP. In response to the financial crisis of 2007–2010, the SWP initiated the Right to Work campaign in June 2009.

In October 2009, the SWP's then National Secretary Martin Smith was charged with assaulting a police officer at the Unite Against Fascism (UAF) demonstration against BNP leader Nick Griffin's appearance on the BBC's Question Time programme. Smith was found guilty of the assault at South Western Magistrates' Court, London, on 7 September 2010. He was sentenced to a 12-month community order, with 80 hours' unpaid work, and was fined £450 pending an appeal. (Smith was arrested again in July 2012 at a UAF demonstration against the EDL in Bristol.)Following a UAF demonstration against the English Defence League (EDL) in Bolton on 20 March 2010, SWP Central Committee member Weyman Bennett was charged with conspiracy to incite violent disorder but the charge was dropped in November 2010.

On 22 May 2010, around 100 SWP members disrupted negotiations between Unite and British Airways inside the Acas building, much to the disapproval of both parties. The talks had to be abandoned. Martin Smith claimed on Channel 4 News that the actions of Willie Walsh, then BA chief executive, were far worse. In the 2010 general election the SWP joined the Trade Unionist and Socialist Coalition; this alliance received 0.04 per cent of the votes cast.

In April 2011, Chris Bambery, one of the last two Central Committee members to have worked alongside Tony Cliff, and the organiser of the Right To Work campaign, resigned from the party arguing, in his resignation letter, that it was ridden with factionalism, that he had learned about the founding of RTW from Party Notes and that the party has no credible strategy to fight the government's cuts agenda. Bambery's resignation was followed by 38 members in Scotland with the intention of forming a new Marxist grouping north of the border. 50 ex-members of the SWP formed the International Socialist Group shortly thereafter.

Internal crisis in 2013–2014 over allegations of rape 
A Disputes Committee document was discussed at the party conference in January 2013 about allegations of sexual assault and rape made by a 19-year-old female member against former SWP National Secretary Martin Smith, known as Comrade Delta. Allegations about Smith's behaviour had been an issue for several years within the group, the first complaint against him being made in 2010. Delta has never been questioned by the police about the allegations made against him.

A transcript was leaked to the Socialist Unity website shortly after the January conference, and the party's perceived failure to adequately resolve the issue resulted in strong internal criticism. One member of the disputes committee had asserted that the party had "no faith in the bourgeois court system to deliver justice". Journalist Laurie Penny, and Socialist Worker journalist Tom Walker, noted that the allegations were investigated and dismissed by friends of the accused, Penny adding that the alleged victim and her friends were harassed by other party members; while journalist John Palmer, a one-time International Socialists member, pointed to problems with the policy of democratic centralism as it had been adopted by Tony Cliff, though Alex Callinicos defended the party's version of Leninism and referred to the Delta issue as "a difficult disciplinary case" in the February issue of the party's monthly Socialist Review magazine.

In an official statement via Charlie Kimber, the party's Central Committee, stated that the issue was an internal matter, insisting that "we strongly condemn" the release of the conference transcript and that "this case is closed". On his Lenin's Tomb blog, Richard Seymour criticised the party's leadership. Along with another writer and (then) SWP member China Miéville and others, Seymour was involved with the internal opposition's blog, International Socialism, established in January 2013. According to Alex Callinicos: "the internal opposition are accountable to no one for these actions. They offer an unappetising lesson in what happens when power is exercised without responsibility". The Guardian reported that a woman who complained about rape in the SWP claimed she was asked a number of offensive questions about her sexual past and drinking habits.  Another article in The Guardian suggested that instead of actually dealing with the rape allegation, the SWP preferred to talk about its internal organisation, thereby protecting its leadership. A report by Shiv Malik and Nick Cohen published by The Guardian the following March said that further allegations of rape have been made internally against another party member.

On 10 March, a special conference was held in which Seymour and Miéville's faction was defeated, and the central committee insisted the report about the complaint against Delta "that no rape had occurred" be accepted. Seymour, who later accused "the leadership" of "rigged debates and gerrymandered votes", announced his resignation while the newly established International Socialist Network gained more than 100 now former SWP members.

Julie Sherry, a member of the Central Committee responded in The Guardian to allegations of the party's sexism. Sherry replaced a member of the Central Committee who disapproved of the handling of the case while Sherry's father was a member of the Disputes Committee who found the allegation of misconduct against Delta "not proven". Journalist Owen Jones speculated in January that "the era of the SWP and its kind is over".

Subsequent to the publicity surrounding the SWP's response to this rape allegation, a number of critics on the left called those in leadership positions "rape apologists"—for instance, these allegations were publicly aired and were the basis of a walkout in protest against SWP candidates at the National Union of Students (NUS) meeting in April 2013. The Socialist Workers' Student Society has been active at many universities, but the SWSS suffered a serious decline in membership as the Comrade Delta scandal unfolded.

Comrade Delta himself was reported to have resigned from the SWP in July 2013. According to Alex Callinicos in June 2014, around 700 members of the SWP had resigned from the group.

The SWP published a review of its Disputes Committee in December 2013. The Committee noted that it had taken on board submissions from members and a number of disciplinary processes in place in trade unions and other organisations. Together, these had resulted in 'substantial changes to procedures'.

In January 2018 the SWP published Guidelines on Expected Behaviour for members. In January 2019 the party conference reviewed the behaviour handbook and made further recommendations which included examples of oppressive behaviours regarded as unacceptable. The Disputes Committee statement included the following phrase: We hope to achieve, and will continue to work for, an environment where everyone can feel able to talk about these matters and then see appropriate action by the party. Everyone is entitled to operate in an environment free from harassment and intimidation in a culture of openness and be fully aware of how the party will deal with any transgression. The party has a set of formal procedures for such action.

Leadership 
The leadership is formed by a central committee, and a national committee. Elections on a slate offers "previously agreed leaders to [the SWP's] members for ratification, rather than an open vote for leadership candidates" to the central committee are held at the national conference each January.  the central committee members were: Weyman Bennett, Michael Bradley, Alex Callinicos, Joseph Choonara, Charlie Kimber, Amy Leather, Judith Orr, Julie Sherry and Mark L Thomas. Two trade union activists, whose names are withheld to protect them from their employers, were also elected.

The national committee consists of 50 members elected annually at national conference. At least four party councils a year are to be arranged by the central committee. At these councils two delegates elected from each branch plus the national committee will be entitled to attend.

Other prominent members include: Paul McGarr, John Rose and Tom Hickey.

Theory 
Duncan Hallas, a founding member of the IS, predecessor of the SWP, wrote: "The founders of the group saw themselves as mainstream Trotskyists, differing on important questions from the dominant group in the International, but belonging to the same basic tendency." Here "the group" refers to the Socialist Review Group, forerunner of the SWP and "the International" to the Fourth International, the main Trotskyist grouping.

The SWP describes itself as a "revolutionary socialist party" and considers itself to stand in the tradition of Leon Trotsky. It also shares many of the political positions of other Trotskyist groups, a tradition rooted in Marxism and Leninism (see for example Tony Cliff, Marxism at the Millennium.) In common with other Trotskyists the SWP defends the body of ideas codified by the first four Congresses of the Communist International and the founding Congress of the Fourth International of Leon Trotsky in 1938.

Its supporters often refer to their beliefs as 'socialism from below', a term which has been attributed to Hal Draper. This concept can also be traced back to the rules of the First International which stated: "the emancipation of the working classes must be conquered by the working classes themselves." They see this as distinguishing themselves from other socialist groups, particularly both from reformist parties such as the Labour Party (described as a "capitalist workers' party") and from various forms of what they disparagingly term Stalinism—forms of socialism usually associated with the former Soviet Bloc and the old Communist Parties. These are seen as advocating socialism from above. In contrast Cliff argued: "The heart of Marxism is that the emancipation of the working class is the act of the working class. The Communist Manifesto states: 'All previous historical movements were movements of minorities, or in the interest of minorities. The proletarian movement is the self-conscious, independent movement of the immense majority, in the interest of the immense majority.'" For more on this, see Marxism at the Millennium (2000).

The SWP also seeks to differentiate itself from other Trotskyist tendencies. Three key theories are at the centre of its difference from other Trotskyists: State Capitalism, Deflected Permanent Revolution and The Permanent Arms Economy (see below).

Unlike most Trotskyist organisations, the SWP does not have a formal programme (like the Fourth International's founding document, the Transitional Program), but an outline of the SWP's ideas called "Where We Stand" is published in each issue of Socialist Worker.

State capitalism 
The SWP maintains an opposition to what it terms "substitutionist strategies". This is the idea that social forces other than the proletariat, which is for Marxists the potentially social revolutionary class due to its 'radical chains', may substitute for the proletariat in the struggle for a socialist society (see above). This idea led the founder of the SWP, Tony Cliff, to reject the idea that the USSR was a degenerated workers' state, the position held by other Trotskyists and derived from Leon Trotsky's analysis in the 1930s. Cliff argued that in fact the USSR and Eastern Europe used a form of capitalism which he referred to as 'bureaucratic state capitalist', and that later so did other countries ruled by what he termed Stalinist parties, such as China, Vietnam and Cuba. Cliff's approach to this idea was published in the 1948 article The Nature of Stalinist Russia as it was further advanced on in his 2000 publication Trotskyism after Trotsky where he discussed the decline of the USSR.

Other IS/SWP theoreticians such as Nigel Harris and Chris Harman would later extend and develop a distinct body of state capitalist analysis based on Cliff's initial work. This theory was summed up in the slogan "Neither Washington nor Moscow, but International Socialism". The slogan is said to have originally come from Max Shachtman's group, the Workers Party, in their paper 'Labor Action' and was only borrowed by the IS/SWP at a later date. This is seen as ironic because one of Cliff's concerns when first developing his idea of state capitalism was to differentiate his ideas from the idea of bureaucratic collectivism associated with Shachtman (see for example The Theory of Bureaucratic Collectivism: A Critique (1948)). However, the formula also echoes the Fourth International's 1948 manifesto, Neither Wall Street nor the Kremlin. Cliff's version of the theory of state capitalism can be differentiated from those associated with other dissident Trotskyists and Marxists, such as C. L. R. James and Raya Dunayevskaya.

Deflected permanent revolution 
As a Trotskyist tendency, the SRG/IS was faced with developing an explanation as to why and how a number of countries in the former colonial world had succeeded in overthrowing the rule of various imperial powers and forming states characterised by the SRG/IS as being bureaucratic state capitalist. In part, such an explanation was needed to understand why these colonial revolutions had not developed into uninterrupted or Permanent Revolutions, as predicted by Leon Trotsky in his theory of the same name. Taking Trotsky's theory as his starting point, Tony Cliff developed his own theory of 'deflected permanent revolution'. He argued that where a revolutionary working class did not exist, the intelligentsia could, in certain limited circumstances, take the leadership of the nation and lead a successful revolution in the direction of a state capitalist solution. The outcome of such a revolution would be deflected from the goal of a social revolution as envisaged in Trotsky's original work.

Cliff's essay "Permanent Revolution" was first published in International Socialism Journal, No. 12 Spring 1963, in response to the Cuban Revolution and largely took it and the earlier Chinese Revolution as its subject. However, the general concept of a deflected permanent revolution would be much exercised as a key analytical tool by IS theoreticians in the coming years. Significant in this respect is the work of Nigel Harris in relation to India and later of Mike Gonzalez on Cuba and Nicaragua. The theory has been given a central place in Cem Uzun's work Making the Turkish Revolution (2004).

Permanent arms economy 

State capitalism and deflected permanent revolution came to be seen as central to a distinct IS politics by the mid-1960s along with the theory of the permanent arms economy (PAE) which sought to explain the long boom in the global economy after the Second World War. This boom was in contrast to the period after the First World War when a period of stagnation occurred.

The three theories taken together are often seen as being the hallmarks of the IS tradition, although this is contested by some former leaders of the IS, including Nigel Harris and Michael Kidron both of whom worked on the PAE and now repudiate it, and by some other Trotskyists outside the IS Tradition. The PAE, the most contested of the three theories, is also the only one that did not originate with Tony Cliff.

The PAE originated with a member of Max Shachtman's Workers' Party/Independent Socialist League named Ed Sard in 1944. Sard, writing as Walter J. Oakes, argued in Politics that the PAE was to be understood as allowing capitalism to achieve a level of stability by preventing the rate of profit from falling as spending on arms was unproductive and would not lead to the increase of the organic composition of capital. Later in 1951 in New International, this time writing as T. N. Vance, Sard argued that the PAE operated through its ability to apply Keynes' multiplier effect. Although briefly mentioned by Duncan Hallas in a Socialist Review of 1952 the theory was only introduced to the IS by Cliff in 1957.

In his May 1957 article "Perspectives of the Permanent War Economy", Cliff offered the PAE to readers in a version derived from Sard's earlier essays but without reference to Keynes and using a Marxist theoretical framework. This was the only attempt to develop the idea, which it is suggested explains the long post war boom, until the publication of Mike Kidron's Western Capitalism Since the War in 1968. Kidron would further develop the theory in his Capitalism and Theory. Additional work was also contributed by Nigel Harris and later by Chris Harman. However it should also be noted that Mike Kidron was to repudiate the theory as early as the mid-1970s in his essay "Two Insights Don't Make a Theory" in International Socialism No. 100. This was followed by a rejoinder from Chris Harman ("Better a valid insight than a wrong theory").

Publications 
The SWP publishes a weekly newspaper called Socialist Worker, a monthly magazine called Socialist Review and a quarterly theoretical journal called International Socialism. It also publishes three editions of a pre-conference Internal Bulletin and a formerly public bulletin called Party Notes as well as various pamphlets and books through Bookmarks, its publishing house.

References

External links 

 SWP website

 
Political organisations based in the United Kingdom
Political sex scandals in the United Kingdom
Eurosceptic parties in the United Kingdom
Sexual abuse cover-ups